Nancy L. Craig is a professor emerita of molecular biology and genetics at the Johns Hopkins University School of Medicine. Her research focuses on the molecular mechanisms of transposable elements, or mobile sequences of DNA found in the genomes of most known organisms.

Education
Craig was raised in Concord, Calif., graduated from Concord High School and attended Bryn Mawr College, a women's college, as an undergraduate. She later described the environment as "empowering" due to lack of female role models elsewhere in science. After graduating in 1973 summa cum laude with an A.B. in biology and chemistry, Craig attended graduate school at Cornell University, where she studied the chemistry of DNA repair and the mechanisms of the cellular SOS response to DNA damage. She was particularly intrigued by the life cycle of the lambda phage, a virus that infects bacteria and is capable of integrating its genome into that of the host cell. Craig received her Ph.D. in 1980 and then joined the laboratory of Howard Nash at the National Institutes of Health as a postdoctoral fellow, where she continued to study lambda phage genome integration.

Academic career
Craig joined the faculty at University of California, San Francisco in 1984. She focused her research group's early work on developing in vitro systems for studying the transposon Tn7, and later cited the success of this effort as one of her career highlights. In 1992, Craig moved her laboratory from UCSF to Johns Hopkins University, where she has remained since. Craig was a Howard Hughes Medical Institute Investigator from 1991 to 2015. She was elected to the National Academy of Sciences in 2010.

Research interests
Throughout her career, Craig has focused her research interests on transposable elements, or sequences of DNA that can change position in a genome; such elements are found in the genomes of nearly all known organisms and gave rise to a large fraction of the human genome. In addition to the unusually specific transposon Tn7, her group also studies families of transposons known as hAT transposons and piggyBac.

References

Year of birth missing (living people)
Living people
Members of the United States National Academy of Sciences
Johns Hopkins University faculty
Cornell University alumni
Bryn Mawr College alumni
American molecular biologists
Fellows of the American Academy of Microbiology